Alexandr Vyrubov was an actor from the Russian Empire.

Selected filmography 
 1915 — Daydreams
 1915 — Children of the Age
 1915 — Irina Kirsanova
 1915 — Mirages

References

External links 
 Александр Вырубов on kino-teatr.ru

Male actors from the Russian Empire

1882 births
1962 deaths